Kenneth A. MacDonald Jr. (1880–1937) was an American architect, known for his residential and commercial work in San Francisco and Los Angeles.

Career
Kenneth MacDonald Jr. was born 1880 in Louisville, Kentucky. His father was an architect. MacDonald trained at École des Beaux-Arts in Paris, as did his early architecture partner George Adrian Applegarth. In 1906, he moved to San Francisco after school. The firm of MacDonald & Applegarth collaborated starting in 1907 and worked together on over 30 residences in San Francisco, including the Spreckels Mansion (1912) in San Francisco owned by Adolph B. Spreckels.

MacDonald was partner in several design firms including San Francisco's MacDonald & Applegarth (1907–1912), Couchot & MacDonald (1912–1923), and his solo firm in Los Angeles (1923–). His office for Couchot & MacDonald were located at 234 Pine Street, San Francisco.

Kenneth MacDonald, Jr. died in Los Angeles in December 1937.

Works

References

20th-century American architects
1880 births
1937 deaths
People from Louisville, Kentucky
École des Beaux-Arts alumni
Architects from San Francisco
Architects from Los Angeles
American alumni of the École des Beaux-Arts